The Will may refer to:

Film
 The Will (1921 film), a British silent drama film
 The Will (1939 film), an Egyptian film
 The Will (2020 film), an American romance film

Literature
 The Will (1905 book), a book by Mirza Ghulam Ahmad
 The Will, a 2000 novel by Reed Arvin

Television
 The Will (TV series), a 2005 American reality series
 "The Will" (Dynasty 1982), an episode
 "The Will" (Dynasty 1985), an episode
 "The Will" (Six Feet Under), an episode

See also 
 
 Will (disambiguation)